Seonamhaeicola sediminis is a Gram-negative and facultatively anaerobic bacterium from the genus of Seonamhaeicola which has been isolated from marine sediments from the Xiaoshi Island from China.

References

Flavobacteria
Bacteria described in 2020